Phonetics is a branch of linguistics that comprises the study of the sounds of human speech.

Phonetics may also refer to: 
 Journal of Phonetics, a peer-reviewed academic journal
 Shorthand Phonetics, an Indonesian rock music group

See also
 International Phonetic Alphabet, an alphabetic system of phonetic notation based primarily on the Latin alphabet
 International Phonetic Association, an organization that promotes the scientific study and practical application of phonetics
 NATO phonetic alphabet, an alphabetic system used in radio communication
 Phonetic algorithm, algorithm for indexing of words by their pronunciation
 Phonetic alphabet (disambiguation)
 Phonetic complement, a phonetic symbol used to disambiguate word characters that have multiple readings
 Phonetic Extensions, a section of Unicode containing phonetic characters used in displaying phonetic symbols on a computer
 Phonetic reversal, the process of reversing the phonemes or phones of a word or phrase
 Phonetic transcription, using a phonetic alphabet to record speech in writing